Norman Harwood (29 December 1929 – 10 August 2008) was a New Zealand cricketer. He played in one first-class match for Northern Districts in 1959/60.

See also
 List of Northern Districts representative cricketers

References

External links
 

1929 births
2008 deaths
New Zealand cricketers
Northern Districts cricketers
Cricketers from Palmerston North